Leap Year is an American comedy-drama series created and executive produced by Wilson Cleveland and Yuri Baranovsky, who also star as brothers Derek and Aaron Morrison. The series, sponsored by Hiscox, about five former co-workers starting a tech company, debuted June 6, 2011, on Hulu and YouTube. The first season had received 3.7 million streams as of February 29, 2012, when it was announced the series had been renewed for a second season, which premiered on June 18, 2012.

Reception 

The series received generally favorable reviews from critics. TheWrap's John Sellers called Leap Year  "a well-wrought online comedy," adding that while the series was sponsored by a brand, "even those who are cynical about such matters should laugh at the show." Forbes contributor Jesse Thomas titled his August 9, 2011 review "Leap Year: The Web Series Every Entrepreneur Should Watch" and New York Observer tech writer Jessica Roy noted, "The show follows the ups (but mostly downs) of building a startup, with a wry comedic voice and plenty of inside jokes for the tech set." In his August 1, 2012 review, television critic Keith McDuffee wrote, "I’m not sure I care about any of these characters enough. I struggle to see what anyone sees in Aaron besides that he's apparently good in business. Aaron's brother, Derek (Wilson Cleveland) doesn't yet have a meaty enough role to latch onto, and Olivia (Daniela DiIorio) is almost right up there with how I feel about Aaron: lots of negative vibes."

The International Academy of Digital Arts and Sciences honored Leap Year with the 2012 Webby Award for Best Online Series. The series also received Streamy and Banff World Media Festival Awards for Best Branded Entertainment Series and the IAWTV Award for Best Dramatic Series at CES in 2013.

Plot

Season 1 (2011) 
After being laid-off from their corporate day jobs, Aaron, Bryn, Derek, Olivia and Jack compete to get their businesses off the ground when a mystery benefactor promises to invest $500,000 in one of their startups.

Season 2 (2012) 
Six months have passed since Aaron, Bryn, Derek, Olivia and Jack won half a million dollars by banding together to create a holographic video conferencing platform called C3D. Now living in Silicon Valley with launch day approaching, the founders of C3D are beset by a mysterious series of setbacks.

Cast and characters

Main cast
 Wilson Cleveland as Derek Morrison, Aaron's older half brother and one of C3D's original founders. A series of events involving a lawsuit sees Derek betray his friends in return for the lawsuit being dismissed.
 Alexis Boozer Sterling as Bryn Arbor, a brilliant coder and C3D's sardonic Chief Technology Officer. Bryn developed C3D's holographic video technology and built the prototype from scratch. Bryn shuns the spotlight but as a virtue of her talents cannot fully escape it.  She would rather spend hours tinkering away with headphones on, not talking to anybody.  She is the type of person who wears a spiked collar so she can stab people in the face when they hug her.
 Yuri Baranovsky as Aaron Morrison, CFO at C3D, Aaron is married to Lisa and struggles with the demanding schedule of starting a company. Aaron is the voice of reason behind Jack's insanity.   
 Daniela DiIorio as Olivia Reddox, C3D's acerbic chief marketing officer, whose short temper leads her to quit C3D until she meets Sam Berry, an enigmatic stranger who motivates her to reconsider her resignation and rejoin the team. 
 Drew Lanning as Jack Sather, C3D's CEO who is obsessed with the idea of becoming an iconic, Steve Jobsian leader, but cannot get out of his own way. 
 Rachel Risen as Lisa Morrison, Aaron's long-suffering wife.

Recurring

Episodes

Season 1 (2011)

Season 2 (2012)

References

External links

 

American comedy web series
YouTube original programming
Streamy Award-winning channels, series or shows
2011 American television series debuts
Television shows set in Santa Clara County, California
Television series about computing
2010s American comedy-drama television series